Tre' Roosevelt McKitty (born January 12, 1999) is an American football tight end for the Los Angeles Chargers of the National Football League (NFL). He played college football at Georgia and Florida State.

Early years
McKitty grew up in Wesley Chapel, Florida. He attended Wesley Chapel High School before transferring to IMG Academy in Bradenton, Florida after his freshman year. As a senior, McKitty caught 25 passes for 341 yards and four touchdowns. He initially committed to play college football at Oregon over an offer from Auburn. McKitty eventually decommitted from Oregon and committed to play at Florida State.

College career
McKitty was a member of the Florida State Seminoles for three seasons. McKitty played in 11 games with one reception for 23 yards during his freshman year. As a sophomore, he caught 26 passes for 256 yards and two touchdowns. McKitty finished his junior season with 23 receptions for 241 yards and graduated a year early. Following the season, he entered the transfer portal.

McKitty joined the Georgia Bulldogs and was eligible to play immediately as a graduate transfer. He became a starter for Georgia three games into the 2020 season and finished the year with six receptions for 108 yards and a touchdown.

Professional career
McKitty was drafted by the Los Angeles Chargers in the 3rd round, 97th overall, of the 2021 NFL Draft. McKitty signed his four-year rookie contract with the Chargers on July 27, 2021.

References

External links
Florida State Seminoles bio
Georgia Bulldogs bio

Living people
American football tight ends
Georgia Bulldogs football players
People from Wesley Chapel, Florida
Players of American football from Florida
Sportspeople from the Tampa Bay area
Florida State Seminoles football players
Los Angeles Chargers players
1999 births